Shesh Bahreh may refer to:
 Shesh Bahreh-ye Mianeh
 Shesh Bahreh-ye Olya
 Shesh Bahreh-ye Sofla